Dederer Stone House-Stonehurst is a historic home located at Orangetown in Rockland County, New York. It was built in 1865 and is a -story, "T" shaped dwelling constructed using regular size units of local granite with dressed sandstone trim.  It features a jerkinhead roof.  Also on the property is a 2-story barn and stone hitching post.

It was listed on the National Register of Historic Places in 2002. All the files a paperwork for this house have not yet been digitized (all the paperwork is still sitting in a shelf somewhere).

References

Houses on the National Register of Historic Places in New York (state)
Gothic Revival architecture in New York (state)
Houses completed in 1865
Houses in Rockland County, New York
Stone houses in New York (state)
National Register of Historic Places in Rockland County, New York